Yvon Rakotoarimiandry (born 5 January 1976), is a retired Malagasy athlete who specialised in the 400 metres hurdles. He represented Madagascar at the 2000 Summer Olympics narrowly missing the semifinals.

His personal best of 49.53 (2001) is the current national record.

Competition record

References

1976 births
Living people
Malagasy male hurdlers
Athletes (track and field) at the 2000 Summer Olympics
Olympic athletes of Madagascar
Athletes (track and field) at the 1999 All-Africa Games
African Games competitors for Madagascar